Glenn Dale Cunningham (September 16, 1943 – May 25, 2004) was an American Democratic Party politician, who was the first African American Mayor of Jersey City, the state's second-largest city, winning the 2001 Jersey City mayoral election. Cunningham also served in the New Jersey Senate.

After Cunningham's death, L. Harvey Smith became the acting mayor of Jersey City. In a November 2004 special election, Judge Jerramiah T. Healy was elected to complete the remainder of Cunningham's term. Joseph Doria was selected to fill Cunningham's Senate vacancy on an interim basis, and won a special election to fill the balance of the term.

Biography
Raised in Jersey City, Cunningham attended Henry Snyder High School, and was inducted into the school's first hall of fame class in 2018.

Before his election as mayor, Cunningham, a former Marine and member of the Jersey City Police Department for 25 years, had been appointed by President Bill Clinton as head of New Jersey's United States Marshals Service Office.  He also served on the Hudson County Board of Chosen Freeholders, as Jersey City Council President, and as public safety director of Hudson County. Cunningham died at Greenville Hospital in Jersey City of a heart attack on May 23, 2004, aged 60. He was a Master Mason and full member of the Most Worshipful Oriental Grand Lodge of Free & Accepted Masons in Newark and was buried with Masonic honors in a funerary procession.

Cunningham's widow, Sandra Bolden Cunningham, has become a political leader in Jersey City in her own right.  She reportedly considered a bid for her husband's State Senate seat in the 2004 special election and a bid for the State Assembly in 2005.  In March 2006 signs appeared around Jersey City touting Mrs. Cunningham as a candidate for the United States Senate either in a Democratic Party primary versus her husband's political rival, Sen. Bob Menendez or in the general election against Menendez and Republican State Sen. Thomas Kean Jr.  Mrs. Cunningham defeated Assemblyman Louis Manzo in the June 2007 Democratic primary for State Senate and was elected to the Senate in November 2007.

References

External links
Glenn Cunningham laid to rest in Jersey City; Dems to meet next Wednesday to pick new Senator

1943 births
2004 deaths
Henry Snyder High School alumni
Mayors of Jersey City, New Jersey
County commissioners in New Jersey
Democratic Party New Jersey state senators
Burials at Bayview – New York Bay Cemetery
New Jersey city council members
African-American mayors in New Jersey
African-American state legislators in New Jersey
United States Marshals
United States Marines
20th-century American politicians
20th-century African-American politicians
African-American men in politics
21st-century African-American people